Metacrambus marabut is a species of moth in the family Crambidae described by Stanisław Błeszyński in 1965. It is found on Sardinia and in Spain, as well as North Africa, including Morocco and Algeria.

References

Moths described in 1965
Crambinae
Moths of Europe